Cupid & Cate is a 2000 American television film which was aired on CBS.

Plot
Cate DeAngelo is engaged. Her sister introduces her to the lawyer Harry, who shows her how to relax and enjoy life.

Cate falls in love with Harry, whom she marries. However, Harry gets cancer. The treatment attempts are not working. At times, Harry's condition worsens so much that he goes to the hospital.

Cate and her three sisters argue with their father Dominic over whether he loved the late mother of women. Cate later reconciles with Dominic.

Cast 
 Mary-Louise Parker - Cate DeAngelo
 Peter Gallagher - Harry
 Bebe Neuwirth - Francesca
 Philip Bosco - Dominic DeAngelo
 Rebecca Luker - Annette
 Joanna Going - Cynthia
 Brenda Fricker - Willie Hendley
 Peter McRobbie - Dr. Brimmer

References

External links 

CBS network films
2000 television films
2000 films
2000s English-language films